The Women's sprint race of the 2016 FIL World Luge Championships was held on 29 January 2016.

Results
The qualification run was started at 10:07 and the final run at 15:16.

References

Men's sprint